The following is a list of United States ambassadors, or other chiefs of mission, to Peru. The title given by the United States State Department to this position is currently Ambassador Extraordinary and Minister Plenipotentiary.

List of representatives

Notes

See also
Peru – United States relations
Foreign relations of Peru
Ambassadors of the United States
Embassy of the United States, Lima

References
United States Department of State: Background notes on Peru

External links
 United States Department of State: Chiefs of Mission for Peru
 United States Department of State: Peru
 United States Embassy in Lima

Peru
Main
United States